The Yorkshire Women's cricket team is the women's representative cricket team for the English historic county of Yorkshire. They play their home games at St George's Road, Harrogate, and are captained by Hollie Armitage. In 2019, they played in Division One of the final season of the Women's County Championship, and have since competed in the Women's Twenty20 Cup. Yorkshire contribute some players to making up a North Representative XI, and they are partnered with the regional side Northern Diamonds.

History

1935–1996: Early History
Yorkshire Women played their first recorded match in 1935, against Yorkshire Cricket Federation Women. They went on to play various one-off matches, often against neighbouring teams such as Lancashire, as well as against touring sides such as Australia and New Zealand. Yorkshire joined the Women's Area Championship in 1980, and played in the competition until it ended in 1996. Yorkshire won the Area Championship six times, including all of the final five tournaments.

1997– : Women's County Championship
Yorkshire joined the Women's County Championship for its inaugural season in 1997, and won five of the first six titles, their run only interrupted by East Midlands in 1999. Key for Yorkshire in this period were players such as Kathryn Leng and Melissa Reynard. Soon after this successful period, however, Yorkshire fell away and were relegated in 2005, and then again in 2007, ending up in Division 3. Their return was swift, however, as they were promoted twice, in 2008 and 2009, including an unbeaten season in Division Two.

Ever since, Yorkshire have played in Division One of the Championship, winning the title once more, in 2015. Yorkshire topped Division One with 6 wins from 8 games, and bowler Katie Levick was the second-highest wicket-taker in the division, with 20 at an average of just 9.65. Yorkshire also recorded three 2nd place finishes in a row, between 2017 and 2019.

Yorkshire have also competed in the Women's Twenty20 Cup since 2009. In 2010, they reached the Final but lost to Berkshire by 46 runs. In the following two seasons, Yorkshire reached the semi-finals, but lost to Berkshire again in 2011 and to Sussex in 2012. Yorkshire came close to winning the title again in 2015, finishing the season joint on point with winners Sussex, but with a marginally worse Net Run Rate. Yorkshire struggled over following seasons, and were relegated in 2018 before finishing 4th in Division Two in 2019. In 2021, they competed in the North Group of the Twenty20 Cup, finishing 4th with two wins and six matches abandoned due to rain. They reached the Group 1 final in the 2022 Women's Twenty20 Cup, but lost to Lancashire.

Players

Current squad
Based on appearances in the 2022 season.  denotes players with international caps.

Notable players
Players who have played for Yorkshire and played internationally are listed below, in order of first international appearance (given in brackets):

 Mona Greenwood (1937)
 Mary Duggan (1949)
 Mary Johnson (1949)
 Barbara Wood (1949)
 Margaret Lockwood (1951)
 Polly Marshall (1954)
 Ruth Westbrook (1957)
 Helen Sharpe (1957)
 Mollie Hunt (1960)
 Lesley Clifford (1966)
 June Stephenson (1966)
 Rosemary Goodchild (1966)
 Jill Need (1968)
 Julia Greenwood (1973)
 Sue Hilliam (1973)
 Margaret Peear (1979)
 Janet Tedstone (1979)
 Karen Jobling (1982)
 Jane Powell (1984)
 Sue Metcalfe (1984)
 Jill Stockdale (1984)
 Gillian Smith (1986)
 Amanda Stinson (1986)
 Joan Lee (1986)
 Mary-Pat Moore (1987)
 Debra Maybury (1988)
 Clare Taylor (1988)
 Cathy Cooke (1989)
 Helen Plimmer (1989)
 Jet van Noortwijk (1989)
 Alison Elder (1990)
 Linda Burnley (1990)
 Kathryn Leng (1995)
 Melissa Reynard (1995)
 Bev Nicholson (1996)
 Nicola Holt (1996)
 Laura Spragg (1999)
 Helen Wardlaw (2002)
 Jenny Gunn (2004)
 Katherine Brunt (2004)
 Danielle Hazell (2009)
 Alyssa Healy (2010)
 Liz Perry (2010)
 Lauren Winfield-Hill (2013)
 Beth Langston (2013)
 Leigh Kasperek (2015)
 Beth Mooney (2016)
 Becky Glen (2018)
 Rachel Slater (2022)

Seasons

Women's County Championship

Women's Twenty20 Cup

Honours
 Women's Area Championship:
 Champions (6) – 1988, 1992, 1993, 1994, 1995, 1996
 County Championship:
 Division One Champions (6) – 1997, 1998, 2000, 2001, 2002, 2015

See also
 Yorkshire County Cricket Club
 Northern Diamonds
 North Representative XI

References

Cricket in Yorkshire
Women's cricket teams in England